Power walking or speed walking is the act of walking with a speed at the upper end of the natural range for the walking gait, typically 7 to 9 km/h (4.5 to 5.5 mph). To qualify as power walking as opposed to jogging or running, at least one foot must be in contact with the ground at all times (see walking for a formal definition).

History and technique

In 1999, the Berlin Marathon included a Power Walking division. 

Power walking is often confused with racewalking.

Power walking techniques involve the following:
 The walker must walk straight
 The walker must walk doing an alternating movement of feet and arms
 The walker must walk with one foot in permanent contact with the ground
 The leading leg must be bent
 Each advancing foot strike must be heel to toe at all times
 The walker must walk not doing an exaggerated swivel to the hip
 The arms spread completely from the elbows and these move back

Competitions and world records
Competitions are held for power walking competitions, with world records held in categories including 5 km, 10 km, half marathon, 30 km, marathon, and multiday distances.

Health and fitness

Power walking has been recommended by health experts such as Kenneth H. Cooper as an alternative to jogging for a low-to-moderate exercise regime, for instance 60–80% of maximum heart rate (HRmax). At the upper range, walking and jogging are almost equally efficient, and the walking gait gives significantly less impact to the joints.

Early bodybuilding champion Steve Reeves was an early advocate and wrote the book Powerwalking about his experiences with it and its health benefits. 

A 2021 study, where post coronary angioplasty patients were introduced power walking based on their ejection fraction, VO2 max calculation, heart rate monitoring and pedometer counts. Those participants in power walking group benefited significantly on quality of life and various physiological parameters.

Physiologically, a normal adult walking at a speed of 4–6 km/hr has the least aerobic requirement and low exercise intensity. Running is preferred over walking at a speed equal to or greater than eight km/hr, since running at a higher speed consumes less oxygen than walking. When running is a significant problem, particularly in patients with post-coronary angioplasty with or without stents, power walking was recommended. Power walking with 6-8 Km/h speed, patients can achieve the benefits of running i.e., significant improvement in V02 Max., maximal aerobic capacity. To put simply power walking is augmented with speed of walking.

Sources

Reeves, Steve. (1982) Power Walking, Bobbs-Merrill.

References

External links
World Ranking -National and World Race Walking

Walking